Bagging may refer to:

In statistics, data mining and machine learning, bootstrap aggregating
The random subspace method, also called attribute bagging
In mountaineering, peak bagging
In medicine, ventilating a patient with a bag valve mask 
In agriculture, the bagging hook, a form of reap hook or sickle
In drug slang, bagging is a form of drug abuse akin to huffing
Teabagging, a sexual act